A bell tower is a tower that contains or is designed to contain one or more bells.

Bell tower may also refer to:

Architecture and towers

Styles
Bell tower (wat), in Thai architecture
Bell tower (Chinese Buddhism), in Han Chinese Buddhist temple design

Individual structures
Bell Tower (Edmonton), an office tower in Edmonton, Canada
Bell tower (Königsberg), Germany
Bell Tower (Pennsylvania Railroad), Marcus Hook, Pennsylvania, US
Bell Tower (University of Portland), Oregon, US
Bell Tower of Xi'an, a Zhonglou (Bell Tower) in Xi'an, China
Gulou and Zhonglou (Beijing), a Zhonglou (Bell Tower) in Beijing, China
Ivan the Great Bell Tower in the Kremlin, Moscow, Russia
Swan Bells, a campanile in Perth, Western Australia
 Bell Tower, also known as Kissing Couple, in Colorado, US

Fiction
The Bell-Tower, one of Herman Melville's Piazza Tales

Film and TV
Jonggak (The Bell Tower, subtitled Missing another Dawn), Korean film with Heo Jang-kang
The Bell Tower, 1953 TV episode Foreign Intrigue
The Bell Tower, episode of Heidi (2007 TV series)

Music
The Bell Tower, a chamber opera by Ernst Krenek after Melville's story
Bell Tower (band), Canadian alternative rock
The Belltower, American alternative rock group

See also
Belfry (disambiguation)